Marvin Weinberger (born 4 April 1989) in Laßnitzhöhe is an Austrian football striker for SC Kalsdorf.

References

1989 births
Living people
SK Sturm Graz players
Kapfenberger SV players
Austrian footballers
Association football forwards